Rodina is a rural locality (a selo) in Tabynsky Selsoviet, Gafuriysky District, Bashkortostan, Russia. The population was 703 as of 2010. There are 16 streets.

Geography 
Rodina is located 9 km northwest of Krasnousolsky (the district's administrative centre) by road. Krasnodubrovsk is the nearest rural locality.

References 

Rural localities in Gafuriysky District